Mary-Pat Green is an American film, television, and theatre actress.

Career

Television and film 
She is best known for playing Odessa on the television series Any Day Now. She has appeared as a guest star on many television series, including Saving Grace, Eli Stone, My Name Is Earl,  Home Improvement, NYPD Blue, Married... with Children, Melrose Place, The Drew Carey Show, Step by Step, Murder, She Wrote, Friends, Millennium, Buffy the Vampire Slayer, Ally McBeal, Six Feet Under, The West Wing, Desperate Housewives, Cold Case, The Middle, Anger Management, Mom, and others.

Theatre 
Green has appeared on Broadway in the original cast of Sweeney Todd and the 1974 revival of Candide. She has performed the role of Reverend Mother in Nunsense over 1500 times and in 2002 she played Lorena Hickok in Michael John LaChiusa's stage musical First Lady Suite.

In 1989, Green took over the role of Miss Hannigan in a production of Annie at the Starlight Theatre in Kansas City when Eileen Brennan broke her leg.

In 1996, she played the title role in the premiere of Claudia Allen's Hannah Free at Victory Gardens Theatre in Chicago. Richard Christiansen of Chicago Tribune said her role was "admirably acted".

Filmography

Film

Television

References

External links
 
 

Year of birth missing (living people)
Living people
American film actresses
American television actresses
American stage actresses
Place of birth missing (living people)